Steven James "Steve" McGavin (born 24 January 1969) is an English former professional footballer. He works as head of recruitment at Norwich City after leaving Ipswich Town's academy.

Playing career
Born in North Walsham, McGavin played non-League football for Sudbury Town in his late teens and early 20s, before being signed by Colchester United for £10,000 in July 1992. After scoring 17 goals in 58 games, he was signed by Birmingham City for £150,000 in January 1994. However, after 23 matches and only two goals, he was sold to Wycombe Wanderers for £175,000 in March 1995.

In January 1999 he was released by Wycombe, and in February signed for Southend United on a free transfer, but failed to score in eleven appearances. He signed for Northampton Town in August that year, but did not make a first team appearance. In October he returned to Colchester, where he made 75 appearances over two seasons.

After being released by Colchester in July 2001, he returned to non-League football and signed for Dagenham & Redbridge. He later moved on to Harwich & Parkeston (where he was player-manager), Stanway Rovers, Clacton Town, and Bury Town. McGavin also played amateur football for Real Benalmadena in Andalucia, Spain.

Coaching career 
McGavin was briefly player-manager of Harwich & Parkeston in the 2002-03 season. After retirement, McGavin worked within Colchester United's commercial department. Additionally, he shortly coached at youth level: training the U12's at Marbella Paraiso CF.

In August 2012, McGavin was appointed Head of Academy Recruitment at Ipswich Town. He joined Norwich City in 2017, and later Aston Villa in similar roles.

Personal life
McGavin's youngest son, Brett McGavin, is also a footballer.

Honours
Colchester United
 Football Conference: 1991–92
 FA Trophy: 1991–92

Individual
 Non-League Player of the Year: 1991-92

References

External links
 Steve McGavin at Colchester United Archive Database
 

1969 births
Living people
People from North Walsham
English footballers
Association football forwards
English Football League players
National League (English football) players
Sudbury Town F.C. players
Colchester United F.C. players
Birmingham City F.C. players
Wycombe Wanderers F.C. players
Southend United F.C. players
Northampton Town F.C. players
Dagenham & Redbridge F.C. players
Harwich & Parkeston F.C. players
Stanway Rovers F.C. players
F.C. Clacton players
Bury Town F.C. players